Luis Antonio Colón Aquino [ah-KEE-noh] (born May 19, 1965) is a Puerto Rican former middle relief pitcher in Major League Baseball who played for the Toronto Blue Jays (1986), Kansas City Royals (1988–1992), Florida Marlins (1993–1994), Montreal Expos (1995) and San Francisco Giants (1995).

Career
Aquino signed with the Toronto Blue Jays as an amateur free agent in 1981 and made his major league debut with Toronto in 1986.  He was later traded to the Kansas City Royals for Juan Beníquez. Aquino played most of his professional career with the Royals, but also had major league appearances for the Marlins, Expos and Giants.

In a nine-year career, Aquino posted a 31–32 record with five saves and an ERA of 3.68, lower than the league average over his career.

Aquino was a member of the inaugural Florida Marlins team that began play in 1993.

See also
 List of Major League Baseball players from Puerto Rico

External links

 Luis Aquino - Baseballbiography.com
 The 100 Greatest Royals of All-Time- #80 Luis Aquino

1964 births
Living people
Florence Blue Jays players
Florida Marlins players
Gulf Coast Blue Jays players
Gulf Coast Marlins players
Kansas City Royals players
Kinston Blue Jays players
Kintetsu Buffaloes players
Knoxville Blue Jays players
Major League Baseball pitchers
Major League Baseball players from Puerto Rico
Montreal Expos players
Nashua Pride players
Newburgh Black Diamonds players
Nippon Professional Baseball pitchers
Omaha Royals players
People from Santurce, Puerto Rico
Portland Sea Dogs players
Puerto Rican expatriate baseball players in Canada
Puerto Rican expatriate baseball players in Japan
San Francisco Giants players
San Jose Giants players
Sportspeople from San Juan, Puerto Rico
Syracuse Chiefs players
Toronto Blue Jays players